Lionel Gerard Green (born November 11, 1994), better known by the ring name Lio Rush, is an American professional wrestler and musician currently signed to New Japan Pro Wrestling (NJPW), where he is a member of the Chaos stable. He has also appeared for Lucha Libre AAA Worldwide (AAA), where he performed as Aracno.

Rush also worked for WWE, where he was the youngest NXT Cruiserweight Champion. In WWE, he also served as the manager of Bobby Lashley and was the winner of the 2018 WWE United Kingdom Championship Invitational. He is also known for his time in Ring of Honor (ROH), where he won the 2016 Top Prospect Tournament, and in Combat Zone Wrestling (CZW), where won the CZW World Heavyweight Championship once and the CZW Wired Championship twice.

Early life 
Green was born to two gospel singers. His childhood bedroom sat above his father's recording studio. He remembered wanting to be a professional wrestler since he was five years old. As a teenager and into early adulthood, Green struggled with mental health issues. During his teenage years, there was a point where it got so severe that he had to be hospitalized for a few days.

Professional wrestling career

Independent circuit (2014–2017)
Rush debuted under the ring name "LI Green", but after a negative response to the name from promoters, he changed it to "Lennon Duffy". He learned to wrestle during 2014 with MCW Training Center. He debuted at the 2014 Tribute to the Legends and created a tag team named "Sudden Impact" with Patrick Clark, who would go on to work for WWE as Velveteen Dream. On July 18, he won the Shane Shamrock Memorial Cup XV, defeating Brandon Scott, Drolix, Eddie Edwards, Matt Cross and Shane Strickland in a six-way elimination match. On October 3, he and his teammate Patrick Clark won the MCW Tag Team Championship, defeating The Hell Cats and The Ecktourage. They lost the title thirteen days later to The Ecktourage. He also competed for Evolve Wrestling where he defeated Fred Yehi on November 6. He lost his match against Ethan Page the following day. Lucha Libre Elite announced Rush as a participant in the Elite World Championship. On Thursday June 23, 2016, Rush defeated David Tita in the first day of the Elite World Championship to make the quarter final. On Saturday June 25, 2016, he was defeated by Michael Elgin. On February 18, 2017, Rush made his debut for Pro Wrestling Guerrilla at "Only Kings Understand Each Other", where he was defeated by Ricochet. On May 27, 2017, Rush defeated Ken Broadway at House of Glory's "Adrenaline" to capture the HOG Crown Jewel Championship, ending Broadway's almost year long reign. Rush lost the title to HOG World Heavyweight Champion Anthony Gangone in a title for title match at House of Glory's "Never Trust a Snake" on July 1.

Combat Zone Wrestling (2014–2017)
Green, as Lennon Duffy, made his debut for Combat Zone Wrestling (CZW) on December 31, 2014, defeating Slugger Clark. He and Clark began to compete together as known as Sudden Impact. On September 12, he changed his name to "Lio Rush" and started a feud with Joey Janela, where he faced him, Trevor Lee and Caleb Konley at Down With the Sickness 2015; the match was won by Janela. At Night of Infamy, on November 21, he wrestled Joey Janela for the CZW Wired Championship on a losing effort. On December 12, during Cage of Death XVII, he won the CZW Wired TV Championship, defeating Janela for the title. He made his first successful defense against Kevin Bennett on January 16. He lost his title against Joey Janela on February 13 at CZW Seventeen. On March 26, 2016, at CZW Proving Ground, Rush defeated Joey Janela, Dave Crist and David Starr to win the CZW Wired Championship. Rush lost the Wired title back to Janela in a Ladder Match at Down with The Sickness on September 10, 2016, After his feud with Janela was over he stepped out of the Wired Championship picture and started a feud with Sami Callihan becoming a heel in the process for the first time in his career and adopted a darker gimmick.

On May 13, 2017, Rush beat Joe Gacy for the CZW World Heavyweight Championship. He lost the belt to Davey Richards at a non-CZW(DEFY Wrestling) show, ending his reign at only 17 days. On July 8, Rush announced that he would be making his final CZW appearance on August 5. Rush defeated Janela at CZW Once in a Lifetime for his last match in CZW and against Janela.

Ring of Honor (2015–2017)
Six months after his professional wrestling debut, Rush took part in a Ring of Honor (ROH) training camp. He, however, was not signed due to his limited experience. After getting more experience wrestling on the independent circuit, Rush took part in another training camp and, now with the backing of Kevin Kelly, Steve Corino, Adam Cole, Jay Lethal and Kyle O'Reilly, was signed as a participant in the 2016 Top Prospect Tournament. Rush made his debut in ROH on December 19, 2015, beating Vinny Marseglia in a dark match. Rush went on to compete in the 2016 Top Prospect Tournament, defeating Jason Kincaid on January 9, going on to defeat Brian Fury on February 6 to win the tournament. On March 31, ROH announced that Rush had signed a contract with the promotion. On Supercard of Honor X Night 1 at April 1, 2016, Rush unsuccessfully challenged Jay Lethal for ROH World Championship. At Survival of the Fittest night one Rush defeated Misterioso Jr., Hangman Page and Sho in a Four corner survival match to be in the Survival of the Fittest tournament final. The Next night Rush was in the Survival of the Fittest match where he was the last to before he was eliminated by Bobby Fish. At Final Battle Rush replaced A. C. H. in the Six-man tag team tournament final to determine the first ROH World Six-Man Tag Team Champions where he teamed with Kushida and Jay White and was defeated by The Kingdom (Matt Taven, T. K. O'Ryan and Vinny Marseglia). In March 2017, it was reported that Rush had given his notice to ROH.

WWE (2017–2020)

NXT and 205 Live (2017–2018)
On July 9, 2017, it was reported that Rush had been offered a NXT contract and that his signing was imminent. WWE confirmed the signing on August 21. Rush made his first televised appearance on the October 4 episode of NXT, where he was attacked by Velveteen Dream (his former tag team partner Patrick Clark). On the October 11 episode of NXT, Rush was defeated by Dream in a match. On October 29, Rush joked on Twitter about Emma following her release from WWE; he received criticism from WWE wrestlers and issued an apology. The tweet resulted in Rush being pulled from all NXT events until November 30. He would make one additional appearance on NXT television, losing a squash match to Lars Sullivan. He was then off television again until April 2018.

In June 2018, Rush was moved to WWE's main roster as part of the cruiserweight division, appearing on 205 Live. He also established himself as a heel on 205 Live. Upon his debut, he went on a winning streak, defeating Noam Dar, Akira Tozawa and three jobbers. He suffered his first loss in a 5-way number one contendership match for the WWE Cruiserweight Championship, that was won by Tony Nese. He suffered his first pinfall loss to Cedric Alexander a few weeks later.

Alliance with Bobby Lashley and hiatus (2018–2019)
On the September 17 episode of Raw, Rush became the hype man and manager of Bobby Lashley and was responsible for turning Lashley heel when he encouraged him to attack Kevin Owens multiple times after their match on October 8. Rush then would later help Bobby Lashley capture his first Intercontinental Championship in a triple threat match against Seth Rollins and defending champion Dean Ambrose, when Rush distracted Rollins, allowing Lashley to spear Ambrose and pin him for the title.

Following the Royal Rumble, Rush and Lashley began feuding with Finn Bálor. His last match on 205 Live would be a number one contendership fatal four way on February 5, 2019, that was won by Akira Tozowa. Lashley's feud with Balor lead to a 2-on-1 handicap match at Elimination Chamber for Lashley's title, where Rush was ultimately pinned by Bálor, resulting in Lashley losing the Intercontinental Championship. After the match Lashley attacked Rush, leaving him laying in the ring. The next day, Rush and Lashley were defeated by Finn Balor and the debuting Ricochet. The next week, Rush unsuccessfully challenged Balor for the Intercontinental Championship. However, on the March 11 episode of Raw, Rush helped Lashley to regain the Intercontinental Championship from Balor. The following week, Braun Strowman and Balor defeated Lashley and Rush in a tag team match. Near the end of the match, Lashley fled the ring, leaving Rush to be pinned by Strowman. Following that, he did not wrestle for the company and stopped appearing alongside Lashley after WrestleMania 35 in April. Following the April 15 Raw, Rush started an imposed sabbatical away from WWE.

Amidst reports in May that Rush has backstage "heat" over issues regarding his attitude, including reports that he was disrespecting veterans, on May 15, Rush removed all mentions of WWE on his social media and replaced it with an email for booking inquiries. The problem has been chalked up to be a possible misunderstanding, due to Rush not adhering by the unwritten rules of the professional wrestling industry. In June, he started posting vignettes on Twitter seemingly promoting a return, while PWInsider reported that he was headed back to NXT.

NXT Cruiserweight Champion (2019–2020)
Rush made his return to NXT on the September 18 episode as a face and defeated Oney Lorcan to become the No. 1 Contender for Drew Gulak's Cruiserweight Championship. Rush successfully captured the title (which was now renamed to NXT Cruiserweight Championship) on October 9 episode of NXT. On November 8 episode of 205 Live, Rush went toe to toe with Raul Mendoza in a non-title match that received high praise for its athletic competition and hard-hitting combat. At Survivor Series, Rush successfully defended his NXT Cruiserweight Championship in an Interbrand Triple Threat match that featured Akira Tozawa and Kalisto. This is also the first match to give Team NXT their first point of the night against Team Raw and Team SmackDown. On November 27 episode of NXT, Rush retained his NXT Cruiserweight Championship in a gruesome fast-paced battle against Akira Tozawa. On the December 11 episode of NXT, Rush lost his title to Angel Garza, ending his reign at 63 days. On the January 15 episode of NXT, Rush defeated Tyler Breeze and Isaiah "Swerve" Scott in a triple treat match to compete in a No. 1 Contenders Match for the Cruiserweight Championship against then winner of his No. 1 Contenders Match Angel Garza. He later on defeated Garza on the February 12 episode of NXT and went on to face Jordan Devlin for the NXT Cruiserweight Championship on February 19 episode of NXT, in which he failed to capture the Cruiserweight title.

On April 15, 2020, Rush was released from his WWE contract as part of budget cuts stemming from the COVID-19 pandemic.

Independent circuit (2020–present)
After leaving WWE, Rush began to work with many independent promotions, most notably Game Changer Wrestling, where he had several matches. In November, he signed a contract with the Major League Wrestling promotion. Also in November, he was announced for New Japan Pro-Wrestling's Super J-Cup tournament, which took place on USA. After failing to win the Super J-Cup, he was defeated by El Phantasmo at New Japan's The New Beginning USA. Rush first match with MLW took place at Kings of Colosseum on January 6, 2021, where he defeated Myron Reed to win the World Middleweight Championship. One month later, due to MLW relationship with Lucha Libre AAA Worldwide, Rush defeated Laredo Kid to win the AAA World Cruiserweight Championship and became a double champion. However this reign was not recognized in Mexico by AAA, with AAA booker Konnan stating that Lio lost the title to Laredo during an untelevised event.

All Elite Wrestling (2021–2022)
On May 30, 2021, Rush made an appearance for All Elite Wrestling at the Double or Nothing pay-per-view during the  Casino Battle Royale match as the "Joker", where he was eliminated by Matt Hardy with help from Private Party. After the match Rush announced his retirement from professional wrestling, only to later announce he signed a contract with NJPW, while AEW also offered him a contract. On September 29, Rush officially signed with AEW. He made his AEW Dynamite debut on November 10, 2021 (along with his new tag team partner, Dante Martin) in a winning effort against the team of Matt Sydal and Lee Moriarty. On January 22, 2022, Rush revealed that his AEW contract was set to expire February 14, 2022, and became a free agent on that date.

New Japan Pro-Wrestling (2021-present) 
Lio Rush made his New Japan debut at the Super J-Cup. After that, he went on to suffer a few losses from El Phantasmo. After a victory over Rocky Romero, Rush qualified for the New Japan Cup USA 2021 before making headlines once he and Yoh went on to win the Super Junior Tag League the following year and will face the IWGP Junior Heavyweight Tag Team Champions, TJP and Francesco Akira at Wrestle Kingdom 17. At Wrestle Kingdom 17 on January 4, 2023 Rush and Yoh were unsuccessful at winning the IWGP Junior Heavyweight Tag Team Champions from Catch 2/2.

Music career 
In July 2019, Rush released his debut single as a rapper titled, "Scenic Lullaby". According to Rush, the song is a "first-person account of [his] darkest days and the pain he continues to carry." Rush released his second single, "I Wonder", on August 19. On his 25th birthday, Rush released his debut extended play, 11:11. On May 11, 2020, Rush released his debut studio album, titled Ever After. On July 20, 2020, Rush released his second studio album, The Final Match.

On September 28, 2021, Rush released his second EP, titled Not Found.

Professional wrestling style and persona 
During his early days in WWE, Rush became a heel manager for Bobby Lashley, a role he was praised for due to his promos. Rush mentioned the comedian actor Kevin Hart as his influence to his work as manager.

Other media 
Rush made his video game debut as part of the Rising Stars Pack of downloadable content created for WWE 2K19.

In 2020, Rush was announced as a contestant on the thirty-sixth season of MTV's reality competition series The Challenge and was initially paired with Love Island alumna Gabby Allen. He left the show on his own accord in episode 6, citing mental health reasons and the stress of the house triggering his childhood feelings of living in a group home.

Personal life 
Green resides in Los Angeles, California. He has three sons. He married Sarah Wah on December 21, 2018. Green stated that the tattoo he has on his stomach is a poem that was written by his mother for his deceased brother, Lorenzo, who died at a young age. Green also stated that he did not know about his brother until his mother told him about him on his first day of high school.

Discography

Studio albums

Extended plays

Singles

As lead artist

As featured artist

Music videos

Championships and accomplishments

Lucha Libre AAA Worldwide
AAA World Cruiserweight Championship (1 time, unrecognized)
Combat Zone Wrestling
CZW World Heavyweight Championship (1 time)
CZW Wired Championship (2 times)
DDT Pro-Wrestling
Ironman Heavymetalweight Championship (1 time)
House of Glory
HOG Crown Jewel Championship (1 time)
Major League Wrestling
MLW World Middleweight Championship (1 time)
Maryland Championship Wrestling / MCW Pro Wrestling
MCW Rage Championship (1 time)
MCW Tag Team Championship (1 time) – with Patrick Clark
Shane Shamrock Memorial Cup (2015, 2016)
New Japan Pro-Wrestling
Super Jr. Tag League (2022) - with Yoh
Pro Wrestling Illustrated
Ranked No. 53 of the top 500 singles wrestlers in the PWI 500 in 2021
Ring of Honor 
Top Prospect Tournament (2016)
WWE
NXT Cruiserweight Championship (1 time)
WWE United Kingdom Championship Invitational (2018)

References

External links

 
 
 
 

1994 births
Living people
African-American male professional wrestlers
Professional wrestlers from Maryland
The Challenge (TV series) contestants
NXT/WWE Cruiserweight Champions
21st-century African-American sportspeople
People from Lanham, Maryland
Chaos (professional wrestling)  members
American expatriate sportspeople in Japan
Expatriate professional wrestlers in Japan
Rappers from Maryland
21st-century professional wrestlers
CZW World Heavyweight Champions
CZW Wired Champions
Ironman Heavymetalweight Champions
MLW World Middleweight Champions